Columbamine is a chemical with the molecular formula .  It is an organic heterotetracyclic compound and a berberine alkaloid. Columbamine can be also called dehydroisocorypalmine. It has a molecular weight of 338.4 g/mol and its monoisotopic mass is 339.1470581677 daltons. Columbamine is soluble in DMSO and is a solid at room temperature.

Occurrence 

Columbamine has been found in Plumeria rubra.

References

Tetracyclic compounds
Alkaloids
Heterocyclic compounds with 4 rings
Methoxy compounds
Nitrogen heterocycles